Squad for 2017 WAFU Cup of Nations.

Group 1

Ghana 
Coach:  Maxwell Konadu, The final squad was announced on 8 September 2017.

Nigeria 
Coach:  Salisu Yusuf, final squad was named on 8th September 2017

Gambia 
Coach:  Omar Sise, final squad was named on 8th September 2017

References 

WAFU Nations Cup
Association football tournament squads